Sandersleben (official name: Sandersleben (Anhalt)) is a town and a former municipality in the Mansfeld-Südharz district, in Saxony-Anhalt, Germany. It is situated on the river Wipper, approx. 17 km north of Eisleben. Since 1 January 2010, it has been administered as part of Arnstein.

Sandersleben (Anh) station lies on the Halle–Vienenburg and the Berlin-Blankenheim railways.

Notable residents of Sandersleben include:
Bernhard von Krosigk (1582–1620)
Gotthold Salomon (1784–1862)
Georg Heinrich von Berenhorst (1733–1814)

References

Towns in Saxony-Anhalt
Former municipalities in Saxony-Anhalt
Arnstein, Saxony-Anhalt
Duchy of Anhalt